The 1935–36 Yugoslav Football Championship (Serbo-Croato-Slovenian: Državno prvenstvo 1935/36 / Државно првенство 1935/36) was the 13th season of Kingdom of Yugoslavia's premier football competition.

It was played in a cup format from June 7 to August 2, 1936. Compared to the previous season, the number of clubs competing was increased by four to a record fourteen. The competition was marred by withdrawal of already drawn Croatian clubs Concordia Zagreb and Hajduk Split who objected to the format of the competition.

Tournament

Round of 16

Quarter finals

Semi finals

Final

Winning squad
Champions:

BSK Belgrade (Coach: Antal Nemes)
Franjo Glaser
Đorđe Popović
Predrag Radovanović
Milorad Mitrović
Milorad Arsenijević
Ivan Stevović
Gustav Lechner
Aleksandar Tirnanić
Slavko Šurdonja
Blagoje Marjanović
Đorđe Vujadinović
Vojin Božović
Svetislav Glišović

Top scorers
Final goalscoring position, number of goals, player/players and club.
1 - 5 goals - Blagoje Marjanović (BSK Belgrade)
2 - 4 goals - Đorđe Vujadinović (BSK Belgrade), Milan Rajlić (Slavija Sarajevo)

See also
Yugoslav Cup
Yugoslav League Championship
Football Association of Yugoslavia

References

External links
Yugoslavia Domestic Football Full Tables

Yugoslav Football Championship
Yugo
1935–36 in Yugoslav football